Hendon  is a constituency in London. It was created in 1997 and has been represented  since 2010 by Matthew Offord of the Conservative Party.  An earlier version of the seat existed between 1918 and 1945.

History

1918-1945
The first incarnation of the constituency was created for the 1918 general election. By 1941, the estimated electorate reached 217,900. For the 1945 general election, the areas of the constituency were thus divided between North and South new entities and contributions to other new seats, including the principal part of Harrow East.  The 1918-1945 was a period of near-full adult franchise and saw the most significant adult population increase nationally within the constituency, this coincided with a period of major residential building locally.

Since 1997
In the boundary change legislation passed to implement the Fifth Periodic Review of Westminster constituencies for the 1997 general election, the London Borough of Barnet's parliamentary representation was reduced from four seats to three and the Hendon North constituency was combined with a northern part of the Hendon South constituency, creating the present Hendon constituency. A south-eastern swathe of former Hendon South was placed into Finchley and Golders Green.  Within 10% of the average electorate, the seat avoided malapportionment that would otherwise exist by way of two undersized constituencies.

Including the period of division of the present area (1945—97) the various general elections up to 1997 were won by Conservatives, except for the 1945 victory of Barbara Ayrton-Gould (Labour), in Hendon North (1945–50). The last Liberal or Liberal Democrat to serve the area of either Hendon seat was in 1910.  Only these three parties have won the seat or its predecessors.

Constituency profile
The constituency has been a Conservative-Labour bellwether since 1997. Andrew Dismore won the seat in 1997 as part of a nationwide landslide victory for the Labour Party. Matthew Offord won the seat for the Conservatives in 2010 by only 106 votes. The 2015 result gave the seat the 37th most marginal majority of the Conservative Party's 331 seats by percentage of majority.

The constituency includes the most deprived areas of the generally affluent London Borough of Barnet - Colindale, West Hendon and Burnt Oak. It is more ethnically diverse than the other Barnet constituencies and has a large Jewish population.

Boundaries

1918–1945: The Urban Districts of Hendon and Kingsbury, and the Rural District of Hendon.

1997–present: The London Borough of Barnet wards of Burnt Oak, Colindale, Edgware, Hale, Hendon, Mill Hill, and West Hendon.

1918-45
No national reviews took place between the Representation of the People Act 1918 which enfranchised this constituency and the next such Act in 1945.  Later national reviews took place by the newly established Boundary Commissions for the four countries of United Kingdom for the elections of 1950, 1974, 1983, 1997 and 2010.  As can be seen from the map, during the early period the seat spanned the area made up of the present seat and primarily the two neighbours to east and west, Chipping Barnet and Harrow East.

2010 review
Under the Fifth Review of Westminster Constituencies, looking at the population subset North London, and as a consequence of abolishing ward-sharing, Parliament accepted the Boundary Commission's recommendation that the shared part of Underhill be transferred to the constituency of Chipping Barnet, parts of the wards Golders Green and Finchley Church End be transferred to Finchley and Golders Green and that shared parts of Mill Hill ward be received from the named seats (to the north-east and south-east).

Members of Parliament

Election results

Elections in the 2010s

Elections in the 2000s

Elections in the 1990s

Elections in the 1930s

Elections in the 1920s

Elections in the 1910s

See also
 List of parliamentary constituencies in London
 Opinion polling for the next United Kingdom general election in individual constituencies

Notes

References
Specific

General

External links 
Politics Resources (Election results from 1922 onwards)
Electoral Calculus (Election results from 1955 onwards)

Parliamentary constituencies in London
Politics of the London Borough of Barnet
Constituencies of the Parliament of the United Kingdom established in 1918
Constituencies of the Parliament of the United Kingdom disestablished in 1945
Constituencies of the Parliament of the United Kingdom established in 1997
Hendon